Léon Auguste Marie Bronckaert (born 28 June 1893, date of death unknown) was a Belgian gymnast who competed in the 1920 Summer Olympics. In 1920 he won the bronze medal as member of the Belgian gymnastics team in the Swedish system event.

References

1893 births
Year of death missing
Belgian male artistic gymnasts
Gymnasts at the 1920 Summer Olympics
Olympic gymnasts of Belgium
Olympic bronze medalists for Belgium
Olympic medalists in gymnastics
Medalists at the 1920 Summer Olympics